Goll may refer to:

Goll (surname)
Goll, Wisconsin
Goll mac Morna, a character from Irish mythology
Goll, son of Garbh, of the Fomorians, early settlers in Ireland
Göll, one of the minor Valkyries of Norse mythology